Vítkov may refer to places in the Czech Republic:

Vítkov, a town in the Moravian-Silesian Region
Vítkov, a village and part of Česká Lípa in the Liberec Region
Vítkov, a village and part of Sokolov in the Karlovy Vary Region
Vítkov, a village and part of Štěkeň in the South Bohemian Region
Vítkov, a village and part of Tachov in the Plzeň Region
Vítkov, a hill in Prague, site of the Battle of Vítkov Hill

See also
Vítkovice (disambiguation)